Francis Hammel (11 December 1950 – 6 January 2021) was a French politician.

Biography
An agricultural director and educator, Hammel first became a Deputy in 1997, succeeding . In 2002, he lost his seat to Hart, and tried in vain in 2007 to regain the seat. He also served on the municipal council of Abbeville, running with the Union for a Popular Movement. However, he resigned from his position after only a few days.

Francis Hammel died on 6 January 2021 at the age of 70.

References

1950 births
2021 deaths